Radio Chișinău is a Romanian language radio station, being the only station of the Romanian Radio Broadcasting Company in Moldova. The Romanian Radio Broadcasting Company launched on October 8, 1939 the first radio station ever to broadcast in Chișinău.

FM Broadcasts 
 Chișinău: 89,6 MHz
 Ungheni: 93,8 MHz
 Tighina: 106,1 MHz
 Cahul: 93,3 MHz
 Edineț: 106,4 MHz
 Briceni: 102,6 MHz
 Drochia: 107,1 MHz

Gallery

References

External links 
 Radio Chisinau 
 Radio România "va lansa în curând Radio Chișinău" 
 Echipa Radio Chișinău 
 www.arena.md 
 

Romanian-language radio stations in Moldova
Mass media in Chișinău
Publicly funded broadcasters
Radio stations established in 1939
1939 establishments in Romania
State media
Chișinău